Brown Building may refer to:

in the United States
Brown Building (Wichita, Kansas), listed on the NRHP in Sedgwick County, Kansas
Brown Building (Manhattan), site of the Triangle Shirtwaist Factory fire
Brown Building (Austin, Texas), listed on the NRHP in Texas
Brown Building (Morgantown, West Virginia), listed on the NRHP in Monongalia County, West Virginia